Tapeinotus is a genus of beetles belonging to the family Curculionidae.

Species:
 Tapeinotus ephippiger Schönherr, 1826

References

Curculionidae
Curculionidae genera